Polish Argentines are Argentine citizens of full or partial Polish ancestry or Poland-born people who reside in Argentina. Poland was the fourth largest net migrants contributor after Italy, Spain and Germany. Although it is hard to give an exact number of Polish immigrants to Argentina, as those who immigrated before 1919 carried German, Austrian or Russian passports, it is estimated that between 1921 and 1976, 169,335 Poles permanently settled in the country. Today there are 500,000 Argentines of Polish descent. The Polish minority in Argentina is both one of the most significant minorities in Argentina and one of the largest groups of Polish minority.

Polish immigration to Argentina
It is not easy to determine the number of Poles who immigrated to Argentina. Before 1919, they were registered as Germans, Austrians, or Russians. Polish immigrants to Argentina were made up of three distinct groups: the Catholic ethnic Poles (25%), the Orthodox and Eastern Catholic Ruthenians (45-50%) and the Polish Jews (25-30%). Between 1921 and 1976, 169,335 immigrants from Poland permanently settled in Argentina.

The first Poles arrived in Argentina during the 19th century. In 1890, the first Polish organization in Argentina was founded (Towarzystwo Polskie). For many years, the Misiones Province was the major Polish center in Argentina.

Today it is estimated that between 500,000 and 1 million Argentines have Polish ancestry. Over a quarter of Misiones population has Polish roots (250,000 persons), the highest concentration of Polish Argentines in the country. About 140,000 Poles live in Buenos Aires; other Argentine cities with large Polish populations include Córdoba, Rosario and Santa Fe.

A major organization of the Polish minority is the Polish Association in Argentina (Związek Polaków w Argentynie).

In 1995 the Argentine National Congress made June 8 Polish Settlers' Day.

==Notable people==
 Carlos Bielicki, chess master
 Fabián Bielinsky (1959-2006), movie director
 John Bocwinski, football player
 Juan Pablo Brzezicki, ex tennis player
 Horacio Cabak, male model, TV presenter
 Vladislao Cap (1934-1982), ex football player and manager
 Federico Cyrulnik, stand-up comedian, TV host
 Jimena Cyrulnik, model, actress and TV host
 Gisela Dulko, tennis player
 Paulo Dybala, football player
 Cristian Dzwonik aka "Nik", cartoonist
 Juan Foyth, football player
 Francisco Fydriszewski, football player
 Witold Gombrowicz (1904-1969), writer
 Guido Kaczka, TV presenter, radio host
 Enzo Kalinski, football player
 Diego Klimowicz, football player
 Bautista Kociubinski, football player
 Frank Darío Kudelka, football coach
 Marcelo Lewandowski, former football commentator, politician
 Miguel Najdorf (1910-1997), chess master
 Marzenka Novak, actress
 Mario Pasik, actor
 Salo Pasik, actor
 Mario_Pobersnik, football player
 Ayelén Stepnik, field hockey player
 Fernando Troyansky, football player
 Rubén Wolkowyski, basketball player
 Ricardo Zielinski, ex football player and presently coach

Figures

See also
 Argentina–Poland relations
 Polish diaspora
 Argentines of European descent
 Zwi Migdal
 Florian Czarnyszewicz
 Witold Gombrowicz

References

External links
 The Other Child: Poles in Latin America
  elaguilablanca
  Kultura polska w Argentynie
  SZLAKIEM WYCHODŹCÓW

 
 
Argentina
Argentina